The Gloaming Stakes is an Australian Turf Club Group 3 Thoroughbred horse race, for three-year-olds, at set weights, over a distance of 1800 metres, held annually at Rosehill Racecourse, Sydney, Australia in September. Total prize money for the race is A$500,000.

History

Name
The race is named for Gloaming who jointly at one time held the Australasian record (with Desert Gold) of 19 successive wins. Gloaming had 67 race starts, won 57 and was second 9 times.

Grade
 1978 - Principal race
 1979–2004 - Group 2
 2005 onwards - Group 3

Distance
 1978–2000 – 1900 metres
 2001 – 1750 metres
 2002 – 1900 metres
 2003 onwards - 1800 metres

Venue
 1978–1990 - Rosehill Racecourse
 1991 - Canterbury Park Racecourse
 1992–2011  - Rosehill Racecourse
 2012 - Randwick Racecourse
 2013–2021 - Rosehill Racecourse
 2022 - Warwick Farm Racecourse
 2023 onwards - Rosehill Racecourse

Winners

 2022 - Sharp 'n' Smart
 2021 - Head Of State
 2020 - Love Tap
 2019 - Shadow Hero
 2018 - Thinkin' Big
 2017 - Ace High
 2016 - Veladero
 2015 - Vanbrugh
 2014 - Swaynesse
 2013 - Complacent
 2012 - It's A Dundeel
 2011 - Strike The Stars
 2010 - Retrieve
 2009 - So You Think
 2008 - Predatory Pricer
 2007 - †race not held
 2006 - All Black Gold
 2005 - Pendragon
 2004 - Al Maher
 2003 - Tsuimai
 2002 - Maskerado
 2001 - Courvoisier
 2000 - Go Bint
 1999 - Fairway
 1998 - Arena
 1997 - Tie The Knot
 1996 - Magic Of Sydney
 1995 - Classy Fella
 1994 - Brave Warrior
 1993 - Constant Flight
 1992 - Air Seattle
 1991 - Big Dreams
 1990 - Lord Revenir
 1989 - Stargazer
 1988 - Run Straight Run
 1987 - Sky Chase
 1986 - Drought
 1985 - Handy Proverb
 1984 - Phillip
 1983 - Sir Dapper
 1982 - Grosvenor
 1981 - Best Western
 1980 - Cosmic Planet
 1979 - Kingston Town
 1978 - Kapalaran 

† Not held because of outbreak of equine influenza

See also
 List of Australian Group races
 Group races

References

Horse races in Australia